What Would Brian Boitano Make? is a cooking show on Food Network hosted by Brian Boitano. It first aired on August 23, 2009. The show features Boitano cooking several dishes and then entertaining his friends. Boitano is a self-taught cook, who started cooking in earnest at age 25.

The show's name is based on "What Would Brian Boitano Do?", a song from the film South Park: Bigger, Longer and Uncut, and uses a shortened version of the song as its theme music.

Production 
All episodes are shot in Boitano's home in San Francisco. Boitano comes up with the recipes himself.

A second season consisting of ten episodes began airing on March 7, 2010.

References

External links 
 

 BrianBoitano.com

Food Network original programming
2009 American television series debuts
Food and drink in the San Francisco Bay Area
Television shows set in San Francisco
2000s American cooking television series
2010s American cooking television series
Television in the San Francisco Bay Area
2010 American television series endings